Khalid Hotak is an Afghan wushu practitioner. He represented Afghanistan and won a bronze medal at the 2018 Asian Games in the men's sanda 65 kg category.

References

Afghan sanshou practitioners
Wushu practitioners at the 2010 Asian Games
Wushu practitioners at the 2014 Asian Games
Wushu practitioners at the 2018 Asian Games
Medalists at the 2018 Asian Games
Asian Games bronze medalists for Afghanistan
Asian Games medalists in wushu
Year of birth missing (living people)
Living people